Sylvester Namo (born 26 August 2000) is a Papua New Guinean professional rugby league footballer who plays as a  for the North Queensland Cowboys in the NRL.

He is a Papua New Guinean international and previously played for the PNG Hunters in the Queensland Cup.

Background
Born in Goroka, Papua New Guinea, Namo began playing rugby league for the KK Brothers Vikings in 2019 at Mt. Hagen where he was raised.

Playing career
In 2020, Namo made his debut for the Lae Snax Tigers in the Digicel Cup, scoring a try in their Grand Final loss to the Hela Wigmen.

In 2021, Namo joined the PNG Hunters, playing 13 games for the club in the Queensland Cup. In 2022, he played 16 games, starting all 16 at prop.

On 25 June 2022, he made his international debut for Papua New Guinea in their 24-14 victory over Fiji in the 2022 Pacific Test. In October 2022, he represented Papua New Guinea at the 2021 Rugby League World Cup, playing three games.

In November 2022, Namo joined the North Queensland Cowboys on a train and replacement contract for the 2023 season.

References

External links
PNG Hunters profile

2000 births
Living people
Papua New Guinea Hunters players
Papua New Guinea national rugby league team players
Papua New Guinean rugby league players
Rugby league props